1-2-3-4... Fire! is a song by Penny McLean released as third single from her album Lady Bump in 1976. The single was successful and managed to appear in 6 charts worldwide in the year of its release.

Charts

Weekly charts

Year-end charts

References

1976 singles
Penny McLean songs
Disco songs
1976 songs
Songs with lyrics by Michael Kunze
Songs with music by Sylvester Levay